Orthogonius orphnodes is a species of ground beetle in the subfamily Orthogoniinae. It was described by Andrewes in 1930.

References

orphnodes
Beetles described in 1930